Leonardo Santos (born February 5, 1980) is a retired Brazilian mixed martial artist and 4th degree Brazilian Jiu-Jitsu (BJJ) black belt.

A highly decorated competitor, Silva is a four-time CBJJO World Cup champion, two-time World IBJJF Jiu-Jitsu Championship and ADCC Submission Fighting World Championship medallist. 

In 2006 Silva left BJJ for MMA, fighting in the Lightweight division of the Ultimate Fighting Championship. A professional competitor since 2002, he has formerly competed for World Victory Road, BAMMA, and was the winner of The Ultimate Fighter: Brazil 2 welterweight tournament.

Early life and BJJ
Santos was born on February 5, 1980, in Rio de Janeiro.  His brother is MMA fighter Wagnney Fabiano. He started training Jiu Jitsu when he was 5 years old under the legendary trainer Wendell Alexander (Co-Founder of Nova Uniao) in Vila da penha (Rio de Janeiro) at the Mello Tenis Club. Although Santos as a kid had other interests (mainly soccer) and didn’t enjoy training all that much but he felt obliged to train as his older cousin and brother were avid Jiu Jitsu practitioners. With time Santos started enjoying the benefits of Jiu Jitsu and also started enjoying the BJJ routine, success in BJJ Comps came with this new found love for the martial art.

In 1995 Mr. Alexander (Leo’s Coach) joined with Dedé Pederneiras to make Nova Uniao, one of the strongest teams in Brazilian Jiu Jitsu the world had seen, and Leo Santos soon was one of Nova Uniao’s star competitors.

In 2002 Santos stopped competing at the Mundial (CBJJ World Championships) as this competition did not offer prize money to its competitors. This was something that a lot of fighters pressed for and which catapulted the rise of CBJJO. Santos started competing in CBJJO’s tournaments only (with gi) and was undefeated for over 5 years in that organization.

Mixed martial arts career

Early career, Shooto and Sengoku

Santos make his MMA debut against rising undefeated Japanese superstar Takanori Gomi, who at the time was the Shooto World Welterweight (154 lb) Champion. The fight ended with a Majority Decision win for Gomi.

After this bout Santos returned to BJJ full-time, winning the CBJJO World Cup Championship 4 times between 2002 and 2005. In 2006 after a short time helping his brother Wagnney with his academy in Canada, Leonardo started dedicating himself fully to MMA. He compiled an 8–3 record with major promotions like Shooto and World Victory Road.

BAMMA
He made his BAMMA debut at BAMMA 6, defeating Jason Ball via unanimous decision.

Santos was scheduled to face Rob Sinclair at BAMMA 7, however he pulled out of the fight, refusing to fly over from Paris as he knew he would not make weight and knew he would not be able make the full amount of money from competing anyway.

The Ultimate Fighter: Brazil
In March 2013, it was revealed that Santos was a cast member of The Ultimate Fighter: Brazil 2. He won his elimination fight to get into the TUF house, defeating Luciano Contini by TKO in round 1. He was chosen to be a member of Team Nogueira.  Over the course of the show, Santos defeated Juliano Wandalen and Thiago Santos both by unanimous decision to reach the semifinals. In the semifinals, he lost to Santiago Ponzinibbio by unanimous decision.  However, Ponzinibbio broke his hand during this semifinal fight and was replaced by Santos in the finals against William Macário.  This semifinal-round fight with Ponzinibbio, however, was picked as the Fight of the Season, and both welterweights picked up a $25,000 bonus.

Ultimate Fighting Championship
Santos fought Macário in the finals on June 8, 2013, at UFC on Fuel TV 10. After a strong first round by Macário, Santos rallied and won via submission in the second round to become the tournament winner.

For his second fight with the promotion, Santos faced TUF: Smashes lightweight winner Norman Parke at UFC Fight Night 38. The fight ended in a majority draw.

Santos faced returning veteran Efrain Escudero on September 13, 2014, at UFC Fight Night 51. He won the fight by unanimous decision.

Santos was expected to face Matt Wiman on March 21, 2015, at UFC Fight Night 62.  However, Wiman was forced out of the bout on February 11 with a back injury and was replaced by Anthony Rocco Martin. He won the fight by submission in the second round.

Santos faced Kevin Lee on December 12, 2015, at UFC 194. Despite being a significant underdog, Santos won the fight via TKO in the first round and earned a Performance of the Night bonus.

Santos was expected to face Evan Dunham on June 4, 2016, at UFC 199. However, Santos pulled out on April 29 due to an undisclosed injury and was replaced by James Vick.

Santos next faced Adriano Martins on October 8, 2016, at UFC 204. He won the fight via split decision.

Santos was expected to face Olivier Aubin-Mercier on June 3, 2017, at UFC 212. However the bout was scrapped on May 18 as both fighters were removed from the card.

Santos was expected to face Nik Lentz on June 1, 2018, at UFC Fight Night 131. However, it was reported on April 28, 2018, that Santos was pulled from the event due to a hand injury.

Santos faced Stevie Ray on June 1, 2019, at UFC Fight Night 153. He won the fight via knockout in the first round. The win also earned Santos his second Performance of the Night bonus award.

Santos was set to face Jared Gordon on November 16, 2019, at UFC on ESPN+ 22. However, he withdrew from the fight and was replaced by Charles Oliveira.

Santos faced Roman Bogatov on July 11, 2020, at UFC 251. He won the fight via unanimous decision.

Santos faced Grant Dawson on March 20, 2021, at UFC on ESPN 21. He lost the fight via knockout in round three.

Santos was scheduled to face Alexander Hernandez on October 2, 2021, at UFC Fight Night 193. However, Santos was forced to withdraw from the event, citing a calf injury.

Santos faced Clay Guida on December 4, 2021, at UFC on ESPN 31. He lost the fight via rear-naked choke in round two.

Santos faced Jared Gordon on August 20, 2022, at UFC 278. He lost  the bout via unanimous decision.

After the loss, Santos retired from MMA on September 8, 2022.

Personal life
Santos has a son, Pedro.

Championships and accomplishments

Brazilian Jiu-Jitsu
World Championships IBJJF
4x CBJJO World Cup Champion (2002, 2003, 2004, 2005)
Silver World Medalist (2001 Black Belt Division)
Bronze World Medalist (2000 Black Belt Division)
ADCC Bronze Medalist (2001)
ADCC Brazilian Trial Champion (2005)
4th Place in the ADCC Finals (2005)

Mixed martial arts
Ultimate Fighting Championship
The Ultimate Fighter: Brazil 2 Welterweight Tournament Winner
Performance of the Night (Two times)

Mixed martial arts record

|-
|Loss
|align=center|18–6–1
|Jared Gordon
|Decision (unanimous)
|UFC 278
|
|align=center|3
|align=center|5:00
|Salt Lake City, Utah, United States
|
|-
|Loss
|align=center|18–5–1
|Clay Guida
|Submission (rear-naked choke)
|UFC on ESPN: Font vs. Aldo 
|
|align=center|2
|align=center|1:21
|Las Vegas, Nevada, United States
|
|-
|Loss
|align=center|18–4–1
|Grant Dawson
|KO (punches)
|UFC on ESPN: Brunson vs. Holland 
|
|align=center|3
|align=center|4:59
|Las Vegas, Nevada, United States
|
|-
|Win
|align=center|18–3–1
|Roman Bogatov
|Decision (unanimous)
|UFC 251 
|
|align=center|3
|align=center|5:00
|Abu Dhabi, United Arab Emirates
|
|-
|Win
|align=center|17–3–1 
|Stevie Ray
|KO (punch)
|UFC Fight Night: Gustafsson vs. Smith 
|
|align=center|1
|align=center|2:17
|Stockholm, Sweden
|
|-
|Win
|align=center|16–3–1 
|Adriano Martins
|Decision (split)
|UFC 204
|
|align=center|3
|align=center|5:00
|Manchester, England
|
|-
|Win
|align=center|15–3–1
|Kevin Lee
|TKO (punches)
|UFC 194
|
|align=center|1
|align=center|3:26
|Las Vegas, Nevada, United States
|
|-
| Win
| align=center| 14–3–1
| Anthony Rocco Martin
| Submission (rear-naked choke)
| UFC Fight Night: Maia vs. LaFlare
| 
| align=center| 2
| align=center| 2:29
| Rio de Janeiro, Brazil
|
|-
|Win
| align=center| 13–3–1
| Efrain Escudero
| Decision (unanimous)
| UFC Fight Night: Bigfoot vs. Arlovski
|  
| align=center| 3
| align=center| 5:00
| Brasília, Brazil
| 
|-
| Draw
| align=center| 
| Norman Parke
| Draw (majority)
| UFC Fight Night: Shogun vs. Henderson 2
|  
| align=center| 3
| align=center| 5:00
| Natal, Brazil
| 
|-
| Win
| align=center| 12–3
| William Macário
| Submission (arm-triangle choke)
| UFC on Fuel TV: Nogueira vs. Werdum
| 
| align=center| 2
| align=center| 4:43
| Fortaleza, Brazil
| 
|-
| Win
| align=center| 11–3 
| Mark Holst
| Technical Submission (arm-triangle choke)
| Cage Warriors Fight Night 7
| 
| align=center| 1
| align=center| 1:14
| Amman, Jordan
| 
|-
| Win
| align=center| 10–3 
| Gilmar da Silva
| Technical Submission (arm-triangle choke)
| Shooto: Brazil 28
| 
| align=center| 1
| align=center| 1:47
| Rio de Janeiro, Brazil
| 
|-
| Win
| align=center| 9–3 
| Jason Ball
| Decision (unanimous)
| BAMMA 6: Watson vs. Rua
| 
| align=center| 3
| align=center| 5:00
| London, England
| 
|-
| Win
| align=center| 8–3 
| Sotaro Yamada
| DQ (knees to the groin)
| World Victory Road Presents: Sengoku Raiden Championships 14
| 
| align=center| 1
| align=center| 3:56
| Tokyo, Japan
| 
|-
| Win
| align=center| 7–3 
| Kiuma Kunioku
| Submission (rear-naked choke)
| World Victory Road Presents: Sengoku Raiden Championships 12
| 
| align=center| 1
| align=center| 3:06
| Tokyo, Japan
| 
|-
| Loss
| align=center| 6–3 
| Kazunori Yokota
| Decision (split)
| World Victory Road Presents: Sengoku 8
| 
| align=center| 3
| align=center| 5:00
| Tokyo, Japan
| 
|-
| Win
| align=center| 6–2
| Danilo Noronha
| Submission (arm-triangle choke)
| Shooto: Brazil 10
| 
| align=center| 1
| align=center| 3:20
| Rio de Janeiro, Brazil
| 
|-
| Win
| align=center| 5–2
| Corey Edwards
| KO (head kick)
| Shooto: Brazil 9
| 
| align=center| 1
| align=center| 1:21
| Fortaleza, Brazil
| 
|-
| Win
| align=center| 4–2
| Alan Lopes
| Submission (triangle choke)
| Shooto: Brazil 8
| 
| align=center| 1
| align=center| 2:10
| Rio de Janeiro, Brazil
| 
|-
| Win
| align=center| 3–2
| Christian Lopez
| Submission (arm-triangle choke)
| Shooto: Brazil 7
| 
| align=center| 1
| align=center| 0:40
| Rio de Janeiro, Brazil
| 
|-
| Win
| align=center| 2–2
| Rafael Bastos
| Decision
| MTL: Mo Team League 2
| 
| align=center| 3
| align=center| 5:00
| São Paulo, Brazil
| 
|-
| Loss
| align=center| 1–2
| Jean Silva
| KO (punch)
| Super Challenge 1
| 
| align=center| 1
| align=center| 1:12
| Barueri, Brazil
| 
|-
| Win
| align=center| 1–1
| Gabriel Moraes
| Submission (rear-naked choke)
| Guarafight 3
| 
| align=center| 1
| align=center| N/A
| Guarapari, Brazil
| 
|-
| Loss
| align=center| 0–1
| Takanori Gomi
| Decision (majority)
| Shooto: Treasure Hunt 7
| 
| align=center| 3
| align=center| 5:00
| Sakai, Japan
|

Mixed martial arts exhibition record

| Loss
| align=center| 3–1
| Santiago Ponzinibbio
| Decision (unanimous)
| The Ultimate Fighter: Brazil 2
| N/A (airdate)
| align=center| 3
| align=center| 5:00
| São Paulo, Brazil
| 
|-
| Win
| align=center| 3–0
| Thiago Santos
| Decision (unanimous)
| The Ultimate Fighter: Brazil 2
|N/A (airdate)
| align=center| 2
| align=center| 5:00
| São Paulo, Brazil
| 
|-
| Win
| align=center| 2–0
| Márcio Santos
| Decision (unanimous)
| The Ultimate Fighter: Brazil 2
| N/A (airdate)
| align=center| 2
| align=center| 5:00
| São Paulo, Brazil
| 
|-
| Win
| align=center| 1–0
| Luciano Contini
| TKO (finger injury)
| The Ultimate Fighter: Brazil 2
|  (airdate)
| align=center| 1
| align=center| N/A
| São Paulo, Brazil
|

See also
 List of male mixed martial artists

References

External links
 
 

Living people
Brazilian male mixed martial artists
Lightweight mixed martial artists
Mixed martial artists utilizing Brazilian jiu-jitsu
Brazilian practitioners of Brazilian jiu-jitsu
People awarded a black belt in Brazilian jiu-jitsu
Sportspeople from Rio de Janeiro (city)
1980 births
Ultimate Fighting Championship male fighters
Brazilian jiu-jitsu practitioners who have competed in MMA (men)